The Day of Days is a 2013 Hong Kong television period-drama serial produced by TVB under producer Leung Choi-yuen. The serial premiered on Monday, 21 January 2013 on Jade and HD Jade, and ran for 20 episodes.

Synopsis
Simple and honest Sung Lai-wo (Sunny Chan) is a close relative to the Tong family – a noble clan of Xiguan. The gangster So Fei (Raymond Wong Ho-yin) deliberately flatters him in order to gain profits from the new dock run by Lai-wo; but Lai-wo is merely an idler of the Tong family, and the one at the helm is actually a pre-eminent businesswoman in Guangzhou and the eldest daughter of the Tong family – Tong Nga-wun (Sonija Kwok). She is not only very skilful in taking advantage of various situations, but also bold and resolute at work. However, she sacrifices her youth to take care of her family business, above which she has even spoiled her sister – Tong Nga-man (Lin Xiawei). Nga-man, with a rebellious temperament, deliberately fools around with So Fei so as to irritate Nga-wun. While the Tong family is leading a befuddled life, the valiant mayor of Guangzhou – Wong Kai-yiu (Law Lok-lam), is shot by accident, creating a furore among the city. Lai-wo is then appointed as the mayor of Guangzhou. Seizing the opportunity at the mayoral inauguration ceremony on the fifth day of the first lunar month, forces of evil and people from all circles that have been dormant for a while turn out in full strength to wreak havoc.

Cast and characters

Main cast
Sunny Chan as Sung Lai-wo (宋禮和) – a blood-unrelated member of the Tong family. A movie buff, Lai-wo often spends long days watching films in the cinema. Lai-wo has excellent memory retaining and observation skills.
Sonija Kwok as Tong Nga-wun (唐雅媛) – the intelligent eldest daughter of the Tong family, a socially prominent family living in the wealthy Xiguan district of Guangzhou. She is the chairman of her family's business, Yip Wo Hong.
Raymond Wong Ho-yin as So Fei (蘇飛) – the has-been leader of a has-been gang in Guangzhou.
Rosina Lam as Tong Nga-man (唐雅文) – Nga-wun's younger sister.
Mat Yeung as Wong Tsan-bong (汪振邦) – a minister of the Guangzhou government.

Supporting cast
Tracy Ip as Ng Mei-fung (吳美鳳) – a con artist.
Eric Li as Man Chi-mo (文志摩) – a spy.
Cheung Kwok-keung as Tong Pak-nin (唐百年) – Nga-wun's uncle.
Patrick Tang as Tong Shiu-yip (唐紹業) – Pak-nin's son, and the only male heir of the Tong family.
Ching Hor-wai as Tong Yuk-hing (唐玉卿) – Pak-nin's older sister.
Cilla Kung as So Fun (蘇芬) – the younger sister of So Fei.
Mimi Chu as Mak Tai-ching (麥大青) – So Fei and So Fun's mother.
Helen Ma as Wong Mei-ling (汪美玲)
Law Lok-lam as Wong Kai-hiu (汪繼堯)

Viewership ratings

Production
An internal costume fitting was held on 6 September 2012 at TVB City The blessing ceremony was held on 21 September 2012 at Tseung Kwan O TVB City.

External links
Official website

References

TVB dramas
Serial drama television series
Costume drama television series
2013 Hong Kong television series debuts
2013 Hong Kong television series endings